Manchester Clayton was a parliamentary constituency in the city of Manchester.  It returned one Member of Parliament (MP) to the House of Commons of the Parliament of the United Kingdom, elected by the first past the post system.

The constituency was created for the 1918 general election and abolished for the 1955 general election.

Boundaries

1918–1950
The constituency was created as a result of the Report of the Boundary Commission in 1917, when it was recommended to be called "Manchester Newton Heath". However, when the Representation of the People Bill to give effect to the commission's recommendations was debated in Parliament, the Government accepted an amendment to change the name to Clayton. The new constituency came into effect at the 1918 general election. Although Parliament had altered the recommended name, it retained the recommended boundaries, and was defined as consisting of three municipal wards of the county borough of Manchester, namely Beswick, Bradford and Newton Heath.

1950–1955
Constituencies throughout Great Britain and Northern Ireland were reorganised by the Representation of the People Act 1948, which introduced the term "borough constituency". Manchester, Clayton Borough Constituency was redefined to comprise four wards: Beswick, Bradford, Miles Platting and Newton Heath. Miles Platting had previously formed part of the Manchester Platting seat. The revised boundaries were first used in the 1950 general election.

Abolition
Following a report by the boundary commissioners appointed under the House of Commons (Redistribution of Seats) Act 1949, constituencies in the Manchester area were reorganised in 1955.
The Clayton constituency was abolished, with its area divided between the Manchester Cheetham and Manchester Openshaw seats.

Members of Parliament

History of the constituency 

See Clayton, Greater Manchester

Election results

Election in the 1910s

Election in the 1920s

Election in the 1930s

Election in the 1940s

Elections in the 1950s

References

Sources 
 

Clayton
Constituencies of the Parliament of the United Kingdom established in 1918
Constituencies of the Parliament of the United Kingdom disestablished in 1955